Quazar  is the debut album from the band Quazar. The band was led by former P-Funk vocalist Glenn Goins, who also served as the producer and arranger of the album. Goins died before the album's release, effectively sealing the group's fate. The album was released by Arista Records in the fall of 1978, after Funkadelic's One Nation Under A Groove but before Parliament (band)'s Motor Booty Affair, that same year. The album also features contributions from former P-Funk drummer Jerome Brailey. Both Glenn Goins and Jerome Brailey were inducted into the Rock and Roll Hall of Fame with Parliament-Funkadelic.

The album was reissued on CD by P-Vine records in Japan in 1991, but went out of print shortly thereafter.  In June 2012, the album was re-released on CD by BBR records.  This expanded version includes the single versions of "Funk 'N' Roll (Dancin' In The Funkshine)", "Funk With A Bigfoot" and "Savin' My Love For A Rainy Day".

Track listing

"Funk With A Big Foot" (Glenn Goins, Jerome Brailey, Kevin Goins, Greg Fitz)
"Funk With A Capital 'G'" (Kevin Goins, Harvey Banks, Jerome Brailey)
"Funk 'N' Roll (Dancin' In The Funkshine)" (Glenn Goins, Jerome Brailey) (released as a single-Arista 0349)
"Workin' On The Buildin'" (Glenn Goins, Kevin Goins, C. Watson)
"Your Lovin' Is Easy" (Glenn Goins)
"Love Me Baby" (P. Eure aka Lady Peachena)
"Savin' My Love For A Rainy Day" (Richard Banks, Glenn Goins) (released as the b-side of "Funk 'N' Roll (Dancin' In The Funkshine)"
"Starlight Circus" (Eugene Jackson, Greg Fitz)
"Shades Of Quaze" (Richard Banks, Daryl Dixon)

Personnel

Kevin Goins - guitar and lead vocals
Eugene Jackson - bass, lead and background vocals
Richard Banks - keyboards, background vocals
Greg Fitz - keyboards, background vocals
Jeff Adams - drums, background vocals
Lady Peachena - lead and background vocals
Harvey Banks - guitar, background vocals
Daryl Dixon - saxophone, clarinet, flute
Monica Peters - trumpet
Darryl Deliberto - congas
Daniel Brack - background vocals, Spiritual Leader.

Additional musicians

Glenn Goins, Harry and Butch Watson - guitars
Donald Payne, Glenn Goins - bass
Jerome Brailey, Glenn Goins - drums
Glenn Goins - background vocals 
Samuel Johnson - keyboards
Mitchell S. Boulware- Bass

Further reading

Quazar albums
1978 debut albums
Albums published posthumously
Arista Records albums